is a private junior college in Sanda, Hyōgo, Japan, established in 1952.

External links
 Official website 

Educational institutions established in 1952
Private universities and colleges in Japan
Universities and colleges in Hyōgo Prefecture
Japanese junior colleges
1952 establishments in Japan
Sanda, Hyōgo